Ranger Rick Adventures is an upcoming American animated/live-action streaming series based on the Ranger Rick magazine. The series will be done by Red Rock Films, Bix Pix Entertainment and the National Wildlife Federation. The series will be the first animated television adaptation of Ranger Rick magazine after more than 50 years.

Production
The series was unveiled when Red Rock Films, a Silver Spring-based company, and Bix Pix Entertainment, best known for the Amazon Prime series Tumble Leaf announced a partnership with the National Wildlife Federation to develop a new children’s series based on the award-winning Ranger Rick magazines.

The 22-minute television series will be a modern-day retelling of the monthly "Ranger Rick Adventures" comics. According to a press release, the series aims to encourage children to explore their environment through the lens of one conservation issue per season, such as monarch butterfly migration. The series is planned to be a mixed animated-live action series, with Bix Pix animating the characters and Red Rock Films filming the live-action sequences. The first eight-episode season involves Ranger Rick and his friends meeting a monarch butterfly and helping her rejoin a group from which she has been separated. Over the course of the 3000-mile journey, the characters will travel to Florida and Mexico.

The project is still in development and that the producers cannot discuss the details of production as of now. The studio plans to air the series by the end of 2021 or early 2022, according to an email.

Characters
Ranger Rick Raccoon, a park ranger raccoon who is passionate about nature
Scarlett Fox, a smart, confident, and social media-savvy red fox
Boomer Badger, a innovative American badger who can upcycle anything found from the trash bin or in nature itself
Tunia the Monarch Butterfly, whose determination and vision often launches the team into action. The first season will focus on an epic 3,000-mile adventure to help Tunia reach her ancestral family tree.

Crew members
Brenda Wooding - developer, executive producer
Kelli Bixler - executive producer
Shannon Malone-Debenedictis - executive producer

References

American children's animated comedy television series
2020s American animated television series
Upcoming animated television series
Television shows based on magazines
English-language television shows
American children's animated adventure television series
American television series with live action and animation